Prunus huantensis is a South American tree native to mountain forests of Peru, Ecuador, and Colombia. It may be a synonym of Prunus brittoniana.

Description 

Vernacular names 
Names recorded for this species are: inca-inca (in central Peru); pipe (in Pataz Province, northern Peru); pandala or pundé (southern Colombia); sacha capulí, capulí, laurel or canelón (in Ecuador).

Distribution and habitat 

References

huantensis
Plants described in 1913
Flora of South America
Trees of Colombia
Trees of Ecuador
Trees of Peru